Victor Noel Dallas is a former Irish international lawn and indoor bowler.

Dallas competed in the pairs event at the 1990 Commonwealth Games in Auckland, New Zealand.

Four years later he won a bronze medal at the 1994 Commonwealth Games in the fours event with Ian McClure, Noel Graham and John McCloughlin.

He was named President of the Coleraine Bowling Club in 2010, a position that both his father Noel Dallas and his son Jordan Dallas have held.

References

Male lawn bowls players from Northern Ireland
Living people
1958 births
People from Coleraine, County Londonderry
Commonwealth Games medallists in lawn bowls
Commonwealth Games bronze medallists for Northern Ireland
Bowls players at the 1994 Commonwealth Games
Bowls players at the 1998 Commonwealth Games
Medallists at the 1994 Commonwealth Games